Ford v Warwickshire CC [1983] 2 AC 71 is a UK labour law case, concerning unfair dismissal, governed by the Employment Rights Act 1996.

Facts
Mrs Ford worked from September to July on successive fixed term contracts for 8 academic years as a part-time lecturer at the Warwickshire College of Further Education until September 1979. Then she was told her contracts would not be renewed. Given the summer breaks, the question was whether her summer holiday breaks counted as merely temporary cessations of work. She sought to claim her dismissal was unfair, but was told that her year long fixed term contract was not enough to meet the necessary qualifying period.

Judgment
The House of Lords unanimously held that Mrs Ford was continuously employed, and the summer breaks were merely temporary cessations of an ongoing contract, despite being drafted as fixed terms. Lord Diplock held that there was enough continuity of employment to establish the qualifying period. ‘One looks to see what was the reason for the employer’s failure to renew the contract on the expiry of its fixed term and asks oneself the question: was that reason ‘a temporary cessation of work,’ within the meaning of that phrase’. So for dismissal and redundancy, the period is broken unless ‘there is to be found between one fixed term contract and its immediate predecessor an interval that cannot be characterised as short relatively to the combined duration of the two fixed term contracts. Whether it can be so characterised is a question of fact and degree and so is for decision by an industrial tribunal…’

Lord Keith, Lord Roskill and Lord Brandon concurred.

Lord Brightman said the following.

See also

UK labour law

Notes

References

United Kingdom employment contract case law
United Kingdom labour case law
House of Lords cases
1983 in case law
1983 in British law
History of Warwickshire
20th century in Warwickshire